Adams Township is one of eleven townships in Ripley County, Indiana. As of the 2010 census, its population was 5,119 and it contained 2,045 housing units.

Geography

Cities and towns
 Batesville (partial)
 Sunman

Unincorporated towns
 Morris
 Penntown
 Spades

References

External links
 Indiana Township Association
 United Township Association of Indiana

Townships in Ripley County, Indiana
Townships in Indiana